is the name of multiple train stations in Japan.

 Sugita Station (Fukushima) - in Fukushima Prefecture
 Sugita Station (Kanagawa) - in Kanagawa Prefecture